Sir Donald Henry Trescowthick, AC, KBE (born 4 December 1930) is an Australian businessman.

Business activities
Trescowthick was involved in several Australian business enterprises.

Swann Insurance
With Norman Swann, Trescowthick founded Swann Insurance, which grew to be a major general insurer. Prior to being sold to CGU Insurance, Swann Insurance was Australia's largest privately owned general insurer.

Charles Davis Limited
Trescowthick acquired Charles Davis Limited, a major Tasmanian company which had been established in 1847.

Charles Davis grew under Trescowthick's leadership to become at one time Australia's fourth largest retailer, and third largest department store operator.

The company was renamed Harris Scarfe Holdings Limited in 1995.

Private business activities
In addition to his involvement in Charles Davis Limited, Trescowthick has been involved in several private ventures, including ownership of the Place Arcade in Toorak Village shopping centre in Melbourne Australia.

Community, sporting and charitable activities

Trescowthick has been involved in community, sporting and charitable activities during his business career.

In particular:

 He has supported the Geelong Football Club, and at one time was their No. 1 ticketholder.
 He has chaired Australian Olympic fundraising appeals.
 He supported the establishment of the Melbourne–Hobart yacht race.
 His support led to the establishment of the Sir Donald and Lady Trescowthick Centre for aged care in Prahran Victoria.
 He supported fundraising for construction of the tower for St Francis Xavier's Cathedral in Adelaide South Australia. (Harris Scarfe conducted fundraisers in its Rundle Mall department store).

Honours
Trescowthick was made a Knight Commander of the Order of the British Empire in 1979 and a Companion of the Order of Australia in 1991. He was inducted into the Sport Australia Hall of Fame in 1991 and received an Australian Sports Medal in 2000.

References

 Harris Scarfe Holdings Limited 1995 Annual Report
 Harris Scarfe Holdings Limited 2000 Annual Report

External links
 Sir Donald and Lady Trescowthick Centre website

1930 births
Living people
Australian businesspeople in retailing
Companions of the Order of Australia
Australian Knights Commander of the Order of the British Empire
Businesspeople awarded knighthoods
Recipients of the Australian Sports Medal
Sport Australia Hall of Fame inductees